The San Pedro Pastoral Region is a pastoral region of the Archdiocese of Los Angeles in the Roman Catholic Church.  It covers Long Beach and southern Los Angeles County, with its headquarters in Lakewood.  The current regional auxiliary bishop is Bishop  Marc V. Trudeau .  The region has 68 parishes, 10 high schools, many elementary schools, 6 hospitals, and no Spanish missions.

Parishes

Deanery 17 (Downey, Compton, Huntington Park, Lynwood)

Deanery 18 (Whittier, La Mirada, Pico Rivera, Norwalk)

Deanery 19 (South Bay and San Pedro)

Deanery 20 (Long Beach)

Spanish Missions
There are no Spanish Missions in this Pastoral Region.

Universities or Colleges

High schools

Elementary schools
Our Lady of Fatima, Artesia
St. Gertrude, Bell Gardens
St. Bernard, Bellflower
St. Dominic Savio, Bellflower
St. Philomena, Carson
Our Lady of Victory, Compton
Our Lady of Perpetual Help, Downey
St. Raymond, Downey
St. Anthony, El Segundo
Maria Regina, Gardena
St. Anthony of Padua, Gardena
St. Joseph, Hawthorne
Our Lady of Guadalupe, Hermosa Beach
St. Matthias, Huntington Park
Beatitudes of Our Lord, La Mirada
St. Paul of the Cross, La Mirada
St. Pancratius, Lakewood
St. Margaret Mary Alacoque, Lomita
Holy Innocents, Long Beach
Our Lady of Refuge, Long Beach
St. Anthony, Long Beach
St. Athanasius, Long Beach
St. Barnabas, Long Beach
St. Cornelius, Long Beach
St. Cyprian, Long Beach
St. Joseph, Long Beach
St. Lucy, Long Beach
St. Maria Goretti, Long Beach
San Miguel, Los Angeles
St. Aloysius, Los Angeles
St. Emydius, Lynwood
St. Philip Neri, Lynwood
American Martyrs, Manhattan Beach
St. Rose of Lima, Maywood
St. John of God, Norwalk
St. Linus, Norwalk
Our Lady of the Rosary, Paramount
St. Hilary, Pico Rivera
St. Marianne, Pico Rivera
St. Albert the Great, Rancho Dominguez
St. John Fisher, Rancho Palos Verdes
St. Lawrence Martyr, Redondo Beach
Holy Trinity, San Pedro
Mary Star of the Sea, San Pedro
St. Pius X, Santa Fe Springs
St. Helen, South Gate
Nativity, Torrance
St. Catherine Laboure, Torrance
St. James, Torrance
St. Bruno Parish, Whittier
St. Gregory the Great, Whittier
St. Mary of the Assumption, Whittier
Holy Family, Wilmington
SS. Peter & Paul, Wilmington

Hospitals
 Long Beach Memorial Medical Center

Cemeteries
All Souls Cemetery, 4400 Cherry Avenue, Long Beach

See also
Roman Catholic Archdiocese of Los Angeles
Our Lady of the Angels Pastoral Region
San Fernando Pastoral Region
San Gabriel Pastoral Region
Santa Barbara Pastoral Region
List of schools in the Roman Catholic Archdiocese of Los Angeles

References

External links
 Roman Catholic Archdiocese of Los Angeles

Roman Catholic Archdiocese of Los Angeles
Los Angeles San Pedro